South Carolina Highway 48 (SC 48) is a  primary state highway in the U.S. state of South Carolina. It serves southern Richland County and access to the Congaree National Park.

Route description

SC 48 begins in downtown Columbia along Assembly Street.  It traverses west, passing alongside the South Carolina State House and the University of South Carolina, before turning onto Rosewood Drive and then onto Bluff Road. After leaving the Columbia city limits, it continues through southeastern Richland County as a two-lane rural highway to U.S. Route 601 (US 601).

History

Established in 1930 as a new primary routing, it originally traversed from Gervais Street, going east along Assembly Street, to US 601 in Wateree.  Various adjustments in its downtown routing have been made between 1937-46.  In 1950, SC 48 was straightened out between Gadsden and Wateree, leaving behind Old Bluff Road.  In 1978, SC 48 was extended west to its current western terminus at Elmwood Avenue.

Junction list

Columbia truck route

South Carolina Highway 48 Truck (SC 48 Truck) is a  truck route of SC 48 that exists entirely within the southwestern part of Columbia. It is mostly unsigned, except for a sign at its western terminus. It is also concurrent with U.S. Route 21 Connector (US 21 Conn.) and the western segment of US 76 Conn., which are both also unsigned. All three highways take Blossom Street between US 21/US 176/US 321, from where they turn left off of Blossom Street and onto Huger Street, and SC 48 (Assembly Street).

See also

References

External links

SC 48 - South Carolina Hwy Index

048
Transportation in Richland County, South Carolina
Transportation in Columbia, South Carolina